The 1948 Litang earthquake (1948年理塘地震) occurred on May 28, 1948 at 07:11 UTC. It was located near Litang, China. Now situated in the Sichuan Province, Litang County was then called Lihua (or Lihwa) (理化) County and belonged to the defunct Xikang (or Sikang) Province. The earthquake had a magnitude of  7.2, or  7.3.

This earthquake caused more than 800 deaths. More than 600 houses collapsed in the areas around Litang and Daocheng. Landslides, ground fissures and sandblows occurred in the region. The intensity of the earthquake reached MM X. Some of the aftershocks caused additional damage.

The earthquake occurred in the middle segment between Litang and Dewu (德巫) of the Litang-Dewu fault zone (理塘-德巫断裂带). Litang Fault, situated in the Sichuan-Yunnan rhombic block  (川滇菱形块体), is a NW-trending fault and dominated mainly by left-lateral shear movement. The average horizontal slip rate of the Litang Fault is about 3.2 to 4.4 mm/yr on the Litang-Dewu segment and about 2.6 to 3.0 mm/yr on the segment to the north of Litang. A study of Wang et al. estimated that the Litang fault has a left-lateral strike-slip rate of 4.4±1.3 mm/yr and an extension rate of 2.7±1.1 mm/yr. The focal mechanism was recognized to be a left-lateral slip on a plane striking northwest (315°) for a distance of about 75 km. The released seismic moment was estimated to be about 7.4×1019 Nm.

See also
 List of earthquakes in 1948
 List of earthquakes in China

References

External links

Litang earthquake, 1948
Earthquakes in Sichuan
Garzê Tibetan Autonomous Prefecture
1948 disasters in Asia
1948 disasters in China